Tirumalai Echambadi Srinivasan  (26 October 1950 – 6 December 2010) was a former Indian cricketer who played in one Test match and two One Day Internationals (ODIs) from 1980 to 1981.

Srinivasan was born in Chennai. His father was famous Tamil actor T. E. Varadan. He was first noticed when he hit 112 for South Zone against North Zone in the Duleep Trophy in the 1977–78 season. A string of consistent performances, culminating in an innings of 129 in the 1980–81 Deodhar Trophy final and an unbeaten ton against Delhi in the Irani Trophy, earned him a place in the India squad for that season's tour of Australia and New Zealand. He could, however, not make an impact in his two ODIs and scored 48 runs in his only Test, in Auckland.

Srinivasan died on 6 December 2010 aged 60 after a long struggle against brain cancer. He had had two operations and was due to have a third when he died.

References 

1950 births
2010 deaths
Deaths from brain tumor
Deaths from cancer in India
India Test cricketers
India One Day International cricketers
Indian cricketers
South Zone cricketers
Tamil Nadu cricketers
Cricketers from Chennai